Assumption College Warwick is a private Catholic high school in Warwick, Queensland, Australia that educates students in years 7-12. The school was established by the Sisters of Mercy who have administered it up to 1988. Since 1989 the College has been administered solely by lay staff.

References 

Catholic secondary schools in Queensland
Congregation of Christian Brothers secondary schools in Australia
Educational institutions established in 1969
Warwick, Queensland
1969 establishments in Australia